Rodger Krouse (born 1961) is an American businessperson who co-founded Sun Capital Partners, Inc., a global investment firm based in Boca Raton, Florida, United States.

Early life and education
Krouse was born to a Jewish family in 1961 and received a Bachelor of Science degree in Economics with a concentration in the Chinese language from The Wharton School of the University of Pennsylvania. At Wharton, he was a close friend of his future business partner Marc Leder.

Career
After he finished school, he worked at Lehman Brothers in their corporate investment banking unit in New York City eventually rising to the position of Senior Vice President. In 1995,  Krouse left the firm and co-founded the private equity firm, Sun Capital Partners with fellow University of Pennsylvania alumni and friend Marc J. Leder. With the goal of becoming a regional private equity firm, they located their company in Boca Raton, Florida thinking that they would get advance notice of potential acquisitions in the Southeast before their competitors in New York. The location in Florida did not afford the advantage they expected and for the first two years were repeatedly outbid by large New York firms. Although they did not complete any deals for the first two years, they were able to keep afloat thanks to established contacts at several large private equity groups from their time at Lehman Brothers, especially Bain Capital (which was then run by Mitt Romney). Their first acquisition was a distressed company called Atlas Papers and thereafter, the company focused on underperforming and distressed companies exclusively. Sun Capital differentiated itself from other turnaround companies due to its resource intensive platform utilizing a comparatively larger pool of employed professionals to supervise and manage its acquisitions (although also charging a higher fee). Following this strategy, the business reached $10 billion in assets and 165,000 employees in 2008 just before the market crash. After seeing at least ten of their portfolio companies enter bankruptcy in 2009, they retrenched and as of July 2013, Sun Capital had $8 billion in invested assets.

Krouse served as co-CEO of Sun Mackie, LLC; vice president and director of Catalina Lighting since July 2001; vice president and director of One Price Clothing Stores since 2003; vice president and vice chairman of Northland Cranberries since 2001; vice president and director of Loud Technologies, Inc. since 2003; and director of SAN Holdings of Japan since 2003. In the past he served as co-chairman and director of Labtec, Inc; as director of World Air Holdings; as director of Nailite International; as director of Miles Kimball Company; and as director of Celebrity, Inc.

Krouse believes that what differentiates Sun from other private equity firms is its focus on fixing a failed company's culture: "Our revelation came in 2008, when all our companies were hit hard and we saw (that those) with strong cultures had the best financial results." "Businesses are a collection of assets...and people. Unify them with a common purpose and you get success." In 2013, he was one of the recipients of the 2013 Leadership Award for Outstanding Achievements in M&A by The M&A Advisor.

Political contributions
In 2012, Krouse personally donated $250,000 to Restore Our Future and $60,800 to Romney Victory, Inc, both PACs supporting Mitt Romney's run for president. He served as a co-chair on Romney's Florida finance team. Krouse donated to many prominent Republicans running for office in 2012 including: Connie Mack IV, Adam Hasner, Scott Brown, Randy Altschuler, Bob Corker, Linda Lingle, Jeff Flake, Josh Mandel, and Ted Deutch.

Personal life
In 1991, he married Hillary Kim Miller and has three sons. Krouse lost an undisclosed sum of his own money that he had invested with Bernard L. Madoff. He speaks Chinese. The business partners are said to complement each other with Leder the outspoken optimist and Krouse the measured realist.

References

External links
CNBC interview with Rodger Krouse July 2, 2012
MandA.TV Interviews: Rodger Krouse - Sun Capital Partners May 28, 2013
ReutersVideo: Food services, construction to jumpstart US jobs - Interview with Rodger Krouse - Sun Capital Partners July 11, 2011
Reuters Business News: Interview with Rodger Krouse: "Is America ready for a 'private-equity president'?" July 8, 2011

Living people
20th-century American Jews
Lehman Brothers people
1961 births
Private equity and venture capital investors
Wharton School of the University of Pennsylvania alumni
American chief executives of financial services companies
American corporate directors
21st-century American Jews